Correo Nacional Paraguayo is the national post office of Paraguay.

See also 
Universal Postal Union
Postal Union of the Americas, Spain and Portugal
 Agencia Boliviana de Correos
 Correos del Ecuador
 Saudi Post
 Syrian Post
 Oman Post
 Cyprus Postal Services
 O′zbekiston Pochtasi
 Tajik Post
 Vietnam Post Corporation
 Brunei Postal Services Department
 Maldives Post
 Philippine Postal Corporation
 Mongol Post
 North Korean Postal Service

External links 
Official website.

Communications in Paraguay
Postal organizations